
Mayhew may refer to:

Places

U.S. places
 Mayhew, Indian Territory, in present-day Choctaw County, Oklahoma
 Mayhew, Minnesota, unincorporated community
 Mayhew, Mississippi, unincorporated village
 Mayhew, North Carolina, in Iredell County, North Carolina
 Mayhew Cabin, Nebraska City, Nebraska, stop on the Underground Railroad
 Mayhew Lake, lake in Cook County, Minnesota

Other places
 Mount Mayhew, peak in Antarctica
 Mayhew, community in the township of Horton, Ontario, Canada

Other uses 
 Mayhew (animal welfare charity), animal welfare charity in London
 Mayhew (name), given name and surname
 Mayhew Prize, awarded annually by the Faculty of Mathematics, University of Cambridge